was one of the administrative divisions of Korea under Japanese rule, with its capital at Shingishū. The province consisted of modern-day North Pyongan, North Korea.

Population 
Number of people by nationality according to the 1936 census:

 Overall population: 1,620,882 people
 Japanese: 22,363 people
 Koreans: 1,578,605 people
 Other: 19,914 people

Administrative divisions

Cities 

 Shingishū (capital)

Counties 

Gishū
Ryūsen
Tetsuzan
Sensen
Teishū
Hakusen
Neihen
Unzan
Taisen
Kijō
Sakushū
Shōjō
Hekidō
Sozan
Igen
Kisen
Kōkai
Jijō
Kōshō

See also
Provinces of Korea
Governor-General of Chōsen
Administrative divisions of Korea

Korea under Japanese rule
Former prefectures of Japan in Korea